Samuel Lane is a fictional character appearing in American comic books published by DC Comics. He is the father of Lucy Lane and Lois Lane and the father-in-law of Clark Kent / Superman. 

Denis Arndt and Harve Presnell portrayed the character in the series Lois & Clark: The New Adventures of Superman, Michael Ironside in Smallville, Glenn Morshower in Supergirl, and Dylan Walsh in Superman & Lois.

Publication history
Sam Lane, along with his wife Ella was introduced in Superman's Girl Friend, Lois Lane #13 (November 1959) as a horse farmer in the town of Pittsdale. He was created by Robert Bernstein and Kurt Schaffenberger. Following Crisis on Infinite Earths, a reboot of the DC Universe continuity, he has been portrayed as a US Army General.

Fictional character biography
Following Crisis on Infinite Earths Sam Lane was reinvented as a hard-bitten and outspoken US Army General, with an awkward relationship with his daughter. It was explained that Lane had wanted his eldest child to be a boy, so had treated Lois as a surrogate son, when he was present at all.

This version first appeared in The Adventures of Superman #424 (January 1987), the first retitled issue of the former Superman title. He became a more significant character following Lois' engagement to Clark Kent, being highly unimpressed with the mild-mannered reporter despite his obvious commitment to Lois. This almost, but not quite, extended to refusing to attend the wedding.

When Lex Luthor became President of the United States, he made Lane Secretary of Defense. This inevitably led to Lois, as an investigative journalist trying to prove Luthor was crooked, opposing her father, especially during the buildup to the Imperiex War. During the War, General Lane was apparently killed by an Imperiex probe, when he detonated the nuclear engine of his tank to crack the shell of the probe and give Black Lightning the chance to get through its armor.

In Action Comics #832 (December 2005), set at Halloween, Sam Lane's ghost appeared to Lois while she was trapped in a car, enabling them to talk through their unresolved issues. The last scene of the issue showed the "ghost" leaning against a wall and watching the sunrise, suggesting that General Lane had found lasting peace. Some have also interpreted this as a sign that Sam Lane is somehow still alive.

Project 7734
While believing that their father is dead, Lois and Lucy still grieve for their father. Lucy decides to try and honor her father's memory and give him the soldier he was denied by joining the U.S. Army. Lucy is wounded during the Amazon's attack on Washington D.C. and is secretly rescued and brought to a secret facility. General Sam Lane finally reveals himself alive and in charge of a covert operation called Project 7734. Lucy volunteers to become Superwoman and is given a mystically-powered costume that allowed her to pass as Kryptonian. Lucy is to infiltrate Kandor and gathering intelligence on the Kryptonians and New Krypton. Lucy appears to die battling Supergirl when her suit is ruptured but returns to life with Kryptonian Powers, ready to serve her country again.

General Lane drafts the imprisoned Lex Luthor into a secret operation against Superman and the Kryptonians of Kandor. The U.S. government believes the aliens to be a risk for world's security and begins to create countermeasures against them. Though the full implications of the operation are yet known, Lane has apparently been monitoring the activities several new superhumans that have appeared following the most recent Crisis. One of the superhumans of particular note is Icon.

After Lois prepares to release a very damaging story, Sam has Lois taken into custody. The two finally meet face to face much to Lois' displeasure. Sam tells Lois the only reason he's being lenient with her is that she is his daughter. He threatens to make her disappear forever in a place where not even Superman can find her. To make his point Sam shoots Lois' laptop containing her story. He realizes that she has back up copies but he has made his point.

War of the Supermen

When General Zod declares war on Earth after it is revealed Lex Luthor (through one of his robot doubles) aided Brainiac in attacking New Krypton, Lane puts his plans into action. The imprisoned Reactron reveals that he allowed himself to be captured as part of Lane's plan. The Luthor robot tampers with Reactron's body chemistry, causing him to explode. The resulting chain reaction leads to the destruction of New Krypton and most of the remaining 100,000 Kryptonians, including Supergirl's mother Alura.

Under Lane's orders, Luthor transforms the Earth's sun from yellow to red to rob the Kryptonians of their powers. Flamebird however neutralizes this countermeasure and the sun reverts to yellow and restores everyone's power. At the same time Jimmy Olsen and his associates save Natasha Irons and transmit all of General Lane's activities to news sites all over the World Wide Web. The remaining Kryptonians, led by Ursa and Zod himself, begin attacking the Earth, ravaging the planet. When confronted by an angered Supergirl and his daughter Lois - particularly after Lois points out to him that he has become the monster he claimed the Kryptonians were, as he is one man who destroyed a planet, while Supergirl defies his perception of her people as "rabid dogs" by sparing his life when it would have been easy for her to kill him - Lane commits suicide rather than be made accountable to an international court.

The New 52
In September 2011, The New 52 rebooted DC's continuity. In this new timeline, Sam Lane is re-introduced in the relaunched Action Comics where he is seen attempting to catch Superman believing him to be a menace. He was willing to help Superman after Lois and a portion of Metropolis was shrunken and taken away by the Collector. In his next appearance, he has Kryptonite Man released from custody, believing he is necessary to help keep Superman in check. Kryptonite Man agreed under the condition that General Sam Lane helps him locate his wife. Sam Lane is also seen in the relaunched Superman comics which chronologically takes place five years later in the present day, and his relationship with Superman is not that much different, right to the point where he accuses Superman that his presence in Metropolis is what attracts all the super-powered menaces and for that reason his daughter will always be in danger even though she is now a news producer instead of a reporter.

Following the death of US Senator Hume, Sam Lane was chosen as his replacement and has now become a member of the US Senate.

DC Rebirth
In the DC Rebirth relaunch of the comic universe, Sam Lane is seen conferring in a bunker under Gotham City with Amanda Waller and Hugo Strange. He is later seen as the official U.S. military representative when a nationwide crisis arises. Along with others such as Mr. Bones, Steve Trevor, Waller and Father Time they try and defeat the threat with technological means. This fails with a mystically powered alternate universe Bruce Wayne crashes through the wall and brainwashes the entire group.

In the Watchmen sequel Doomsday Clock, Sam Lane is seen pulling his troops out of Qurac.

Other versions

All-Star Superman
General Sam Lane appeared in Grant Morrison's All-Star Superman. In his sole appearance in Issue 1, he talks to Luthor about how he pulled him out of prison to work for the US Government, but Luthor again threatens to kill Superman, before he dies. Lane then has Luthor incarcerated in Stryker's Island.

Flashpoint
Sam Lane appears in the alternate timeline of the Flashpoint event. In this version, Lane was the officer in charge of Project: Superman. He attempts to bond with Kal-El during the latter's time in captivity. When Neil Sinclair is freed from captivity and trashes the lab, Lane sacrifices himself by pulling himself and Sinclair into the Phantom Zone. The two eventually emerge from the Phantom Zone onto a far away island, and Sinclair murders Lane before leaving the island.

Justice League: Gods and Monsters
In the prequel comic to Justice League: Gods and Monsters, it is revealed that this version of Sam Lane was a war physician who died from the collateral damage from one of Superman's fights, leading his daughter Lois to become a harsh critic of the Justice League.

Earth 2
In 2011, "The New 52" rebooted DC's continuity. On Earth 2, Sam Lane is a member of the World Army. He and Robotman work to bring Red Torando online where it has the mind of Lois Lane. When a cave-in occurred, Red Tornado finds her father badly injured. In his dying breath, Sam told her that he hid the knowledge of who Superman was. Sam then died in Red Tornado's arms.

In other media

Television
 Sam Lane appears in Lois and Clark: The New Adventures of Superman portrayed by Denis Arndt and later by Harve Presnell. Lane was a cyberneticist and he and Ellen were divorced. He first appeared working reluctantly in illegal "augmentation" of boxers. In subsequent appearances, Lane had created a robot girlfriend. In later episodes he tries to repair his broken marriage to Ellen. He has an estranged relationship with his daughter Lois Lane who tries to repair their relationship in later episodes.
 General Sam Lane appears in Superman: The Animated Series, voiced by Dean Jones. This version is involved in the space program. He appeared in "Monkey Fun", with a flashback to when he was a lieutenant, then the current Sam Lane appears to aid Lois after the monkey Titano wreaks havoc in Metropolis.

 In Smallville, Lieutenant General Sam Lane appeared in the second and third episodes of Season 4 portrayed by Michael Ironside. When Chloe Sullivan and her father were put in protective custody, Lex Luthor managed to get General Lane in to shield her from the blast when they got into the "safe" house. In the fourth season episode "Lucy", it is noted that "the General" (as both his daughters call him) was unable to cope with raising his daughters alone after the death of his wife. He modeled his parenting on that of his Army career where he implemented a chain of command. He was in charge of Lois and Lois was in charge of Lucy. Both his daughters resented their father for this. At the end of the episode, he sent Lois to Europe in order to locate his younger daughter Lucy, but it is unclear if the efforts were successful. In subsequent episodes, Lane has been casually referenced by other characters. Chloe states that General Lane provided her with covert surveillance equipment in "Mortal". With it, she helps Clark Kent infiltrate the LuthorCorp building and rescue his family. In the sixth-season episode "Prototype", Lois told Clark and Chloe that Wes Keenan was the only soldier that the General ever respected. Ironside reprised his role as the General (now a four-star General) in the Season 10 episode "Ambush", where Clark becomes the first person to pass the "tests" the General has arranged for Lois's previous boyfriends. General Lane reveals that he gave the list of chores to Lois' boyfriends to test her, not them, and Clark is the only one that Lois has ever stood up for, which proves she loves him. The two bond despite their initial disagreement over General Lane's role in the Vigilante Registration Act, which makes him a target of the Suicide Squad and Rick Flag, before dispatched. As seen on his uniform, General Lane is a recipient of the Silver Star.

 General Sam Lane appears in Supergirl portrayed by Glenn Morshower.  He is depicted as having strongly anti-alien views, and as wanting to take over the Department of Extranormal Operations in order to focus its efforts on the eradication of aliens, even using untested robots like Red Tornado. After Supergirl saved him several times, his stance lessened on them and assisted her on thwarting Lt. Non and Myriad overtaking National City. After their victory, General Lane told J'onn J'onzz that the President granted him a full pardon and re-instated him as the director of the D.E.O. He then took Non's apocalypse device, the Omegahedron, under military custody and later delivered it to Maxwell Lord. 

 General Lane appears as a series regular in Superman & Lois portrayed by Dylan Walsh. This version is a part of the Department of Defense/DoD, aware of Clark's identity and openly cooperates with Superman, although their personal relationship is somewhat stiff and formal. Following the fight against Tal-Rho, Sam tells John Henry Irons that he is planning on retiring from active duty. In season two, Sam Lane is called to the Kent farm by Lois when Superman starts suffering from visions caused by an "invasive cosmological event". While advising Superman to settle his difference with Mitch Anderson, Sam uses his connections to help get John access to the Shuster Mine and was hesitant to help Lois get through to Lucy. He does come through for her. Sam later scrambles the security footage in the Oyelowo family store after Jordan secretly uses his freezing breath to stop some possible shoplifters. He does agree to train Jordan in secret.
 The Bizarro version of Sam Lane appears in the episode "Bizarros in a Bizarro World". He was in charge of the DoD until Bizarro Ally Allston took over it with help from Jonathan Kent's counterpart Jon-El and the Bizarro Reno Rosetti. Since then, Sam has been part of a small resistance with Bizarro Lois and Bizarro Jordan.

Film
 Sam Lane makes a brief cameo appearance in Superman: The Movie (1978). Kirk Alyn, the first actor to portray Superman in live-action (in two low-budget serials: Superman (1948) and Atom Man vs. Superman (1950)) is seen when Lois witnesses young Clark Kent racing the train on which he and his wife (portrayed by his serial co-star, Noel Neill) are riding.
 General Sam Lane appears in All-Star Superman, voiced by an uncredited Steve Blum.
 Sam Lane appears in the animated film Justice League: The Flashpoint Paradox, voiced by Danny Huston.
 Sam Lane appears in Justice League: Throne of Atlantis voiced by Jay K. Johnson. He is seen telling Ocean Master's troops to stand down and forcing them to go back where they came from.
 Sam Lane appears in Lego DC Comics Super Heroes: Justice League: Attack of the Legion of Doom, voiced by James Arnold Taylor. This version is shown to be mistrusting toward extraterrestrial life, exceeding his authority to hold the Martian Manhunter hostage in Area 52 until he was freed by the Legion of Doom. Following the Legion of Doom using Martian Manhunter to set up the Justice League to ruin a prototype nuketron reactor core, Lane holds the Justice League responsible where he supports the World Council's decision to exile them from Earth. When the Legion of Doom is defeated, Lane is angered that the Justice League have returned from exile until Martian Manhunter mind-controls him to dance to the music that was playing.
 Sam Lane appears in Batman Unlimited: Mechs vs. Mutants, voiced by John DiMaggio. Lane is shown to have a contract with Bruce Wayne where he is seen talking with Wayne during a demonstration.

Reception
Chad Derdowski of Mania.com felt that Sam Lane would have been a formidable villain to use for a Zack Snyder Superman film, stating that "Lane would provide a little more dramatic oomph for the film, driving a wedge between the relationship of Clark Kent and Lois Lane and turning the whole thing into a family affair."

References

External links
 Sam Lane at DC Wikia

Characters created by Robert Bernstein
Comics characters introduced in 1959
DC Comics male supervillains
DC Comics military personnel
Fictional generals
Fictional military strategists
Fictional United States Secretaries of Defense
Fictional mass murderers